"Horchata" is a song by American indie rock band Vampire Weekend. Written by the members of the band and produced by band member Rostam Batmanglij, the song was released as the lead single from their second album Contra on October 5, 2009 via XL Recordings. The single was initially released as a free download on the band's web site. The term "horchata" refers to a traditional beverage often made of ground almonds, sesame seeds, or rice.

Commercial performance
"Horchata" peaked at #10 on the Billboard Heatseekers Songs chart and at #2 on the Billboard Bubbling Under Hot 100 Singles chart. It also peaked at #69 on the Canadian Hot 100 and #26 on the Belgium Ultratop 50 in Flanders.

Other appearances
"Horchata" was featured on the Hollister Co. Christmas 2013 playlist.

Personnel
Vampire Weekend
 Ezra Koenig – lead vocals, keyboard
 Rostam Batmanglij – piano, background vocals, vocal harmonies, keyboards, harpsichord, VSS-30, drum, synth, sampler programming
 Christopher Tomson – drums
 Chris Baio – bass

Additional musicians
 Mauro Refosco – marimbas, rebolo, zabumba, shekere, shakers, auxiliary percussion
 Marcus Farrar – shekere, auxiliary percussion
 Anne Donlon – vocals
 Nat Baldwin – double bass
 Jonathan Chu – violin, viola
 Hamilton Berry – cello

Production
 Rostam Batmanglij – production, string arrangements, mixing, engineering
 Justin Gerrish – mixing, engineering
 Shane Stoneback – engineering
 Fernando Lodeiro – engineering assistance
 Emily Lazar – mastering
 Joe LaPorta – assistant mastering engineering

Charts

References

2009 singles
2009 songs
Vampire Weekend songs
Songs written by Rostam Batmanglij
Songs written by Ezra Koenig
XL Recordings singles
Songs written by Chris Tomson
Songs written by Chris Baio